Aklak Air is an Inuvialuit owned airline based in Inuvik in Northwest Territories in Canada. It operates year-round and seasonal scheduled services, as well as charter flights throughout the western Arctic. Its main base is Inuvik (Mike Zubko) Airport.

History
The airline was established in 1977 and started operations in 1978. In June 1994, Aklak Air and Kenn Borek Air set up a joint venture, under the terms of which Aklak Air has access to Kenn Borek Air's fleet as and when required. Aklak Air is wholly owned by Inuvialuit Joint Venture Company.

Destinations
As of February 2023, Aklak operates scheduled services to several communities in the Northwest Territories:
Fort McPherson (Fort McPherson Airport only when the ice road is closed or the ferry is not in operation)
Inuvik (Inuvik (Mike Zubko) Airport)
Paulatuk (Paulatuk (Nora Aliqatchialuk Ruben) Airport)
Sachs Harbour (Sachs Harbour (David Nasogaluak Jr. Saaryuaq) Airport)
Ulukhaktok (Ulukhaktok/Holman Airport)

Fleet
As of February 2023, Aklak Air, through Kenn Borek Air has the following aircraft registered with Transport Canada.

Accidents and incidents
On 4 November 2010, a hangar fire at Inuvik (Mike Zubko) Airport destroyed three aircraft operated by Aklak Air. They were de Havilland Canada DHC-6 Twin Otter C-GZVH, Beechcraft King Air C-GHOC and Beechcraft 99 C-FKBK.

References

Regional airlines of the Northwest Territories
Airlines established in 1977
Inuvik
Inuvialuit companies